Wrestling World 2002 was a professional wrestling event produced by New Japan Pro-Wrestling (NJPW). It took place on January 4 in the Tokyo Dome. Wrestling World 2002 was the eleventh January 4 Tokyo Dome Show held by NJPW. The show drew 52,000 spectators. The show was the first January 4 Tokyo Dome Show to feature wrestlers from Pro Wrestling Noah, with the main event of the ten match show being a successful defense of the GHC Heavyweight Championship as champion Jun Akiyama defeated NJPW representative Yuji Nagata. The show also featured a successful IWGP Junior Heavyweight Championship defense by Kendo Kashin.

Production

Background
The January 4 Tokyo Dome Show is NJPW's biggest annual event and has been called "the largest professional wrestling show in the world outside of the United States" and the "Japanese equivalent to the Super Bowl".

Results

References

External links
NJPW.co.jp 

2002 in professional wrestling
2002 in Tokyo
January 2002 events in Japan
2002